Ptolemais of Cyrene was a music theorist, author of Pythagorean Principles of Music (Πυθαγορικὴ τῆς μουσικῆς στοιχείωσις). She lived perhaps in the 3rd century BC, and "certainly not after the first century AD." She is the only known female music theorist of antiquity.

Life
Almost nothing is known about her life; her work is known only from references in Porphyry's commentary on Ptolemy's Harmonics.  She shares the same place of origin (Cyrene, Libya) as Arete of Cyrene (a female philosopher of the Cyrenaic school, whose doctrines included Pythagorean elements) and Eratosthenes (whose many interests included music theory).  She is one of several women writers associated with Pythagoreanism.

Work
In her work, written in the form of a catechism, she commented on the music-theoretical debate concerning the proper roles of reason and sensory experience in the study of music.  Despite her apparent adherence to Pythagoreanism, a school whose theorists (the canonici) put music on a rational and mathematical basis, there is no apparent hostility in her citations of the empiricist followers of Aristoxenus (the musici); perhaps the methodological division was not a stark absolute during her period or from her point of view.  Ptolemais also makes reference to musicologists who gave equal importance to perception and reason, preferring to see Aristoxenus himself (as opposed to his followers) in this light, and even stressing the compatible role of perception in the Pythagorean theory:

In this same passage, Ptolemais criticizes the extreme partisans of both schools, "the Pythagoreans who enjoyed disputing with the musici" for dismissing perception entirely (despite their contradictory "adoption of something perceivable in the beginning"), and "some of the musici who follow Aristoxenus" for adopting their master's "theory based upon thought" but proceeding "through expertise on musical instruments" and "regard[ing] perception as authoritative, and reason as accompanying it, and for necessity only."

Notes

References
 
 Eleonora Rocconi, "Un manuale al femminile: L'Introduzione pitagorica alla musica di Tolemaide di Cirene," in Ars/Techne, ed. Maria Silvana Celentano, Alessandria: Edizioni dell'Orso, 2003, pp. 99–114

Further reading
 Andrew Barker, Greek Musical Writings, vol. 2, Harmonic and Acoustic Theory, Cambridge University Press, 1989, pp. 239–242
 Flora R. Levin, Greek Reflections on the Nature of Music, Cambridge University Press, 2009, Chapter 7: "Aisthēsis and Logos: A Single Continent"

3rd-century BC Greek people
3rd-century BC Greek women
3rd-century BC philosophers
3rd-century BC scholars
3rd-century BC women writers
3rd-century BC writers
Ancient Greek music theorists
Ancient Greek philosophers of art
Ancient Greek women philosophers
Ancient Greek women writers
Ancient Greek writers
Philosophers of music
Pythagoreans